This was the first edition of the event.

Jan Vacek won in the final 6(7–9)–7, 7–5, 6–3 against Ivo Heuberger.

Seeds

Draw

Finals

Top half

Bottom half

References
 Draws on ITF Site

2000 Singles